The USBC Queens is an annual ten-pin bowling event for amateur and professional female bowlers, sanctioned by the United States Bowling Congress. The event is one of four women's professional majors since the PWBA tour returned in 2015 and the female equivalent of the USBC Masters, now one of the four majors on the Professional Bowlers Association (PBA) Tour.

The format for the USBC Queens tournament is similar to the USBC Masters.  All entrants bowl 15 games of qualifying over three days. The top 63 qualifiers plus the previous year's champion are then seeded for match play. Match play consists of three-game, total-pinfall matches in a double-elimination format. First-time losers during the match play rounds are not eliminated, but are instead placed into an elimination bracket, where they must survive all subsequent three-game matches to have a chance at making the championship finals. The last five remaining players with either one or zero match play losses are seeded for the televised finals, which is a single-game stepladder format.

USBC Queens history
The USBC Queens made its debut in 1961, as a companion to the Women's International Bowling Congress (WIBC) National Tournament. It was known as the WIBC Queens from 1961–2004, until the WIBC became a part of the United States Bowling Congress (USBC) on January 1, 2005. The tournament is part of the World Bowling Tour, annually attracting a field of hundreds of the top bowlers from around the world.

Ten bowlers have won at least two USBC Queens titles, with only two winning three times: Millie Ignizio (Martorella) (1967, 1970, 1971) and Wendy Macpherson (1988, 2000, 2003).  Both bowlers are now in the USBC Hall of Fame.

USBC Queens champions

2022 Event
The 2022 USBC Queens tournament was held May 18–24 at Stardust Bowl in Addison, Illinois. The tournament had 204 total entries and a $358,000 prize fund, with a $60,000 top prize. A five-player stepladder format was used for the live televised finals on May 24. Germany's Birgit Noreiks won from the #2 seed position, defeating top seed Clara Guerrero of Colombia in the final match for her third PWBA title and first major.

Final Standings:
1. Birgit Noreiks (Germany) – $60,000
2. Clara Guerrero (Colombia) – $30,000
3. Laura Plazas (Colombia) – $22,500
4. Danielle McEwan (Stony Point, NY) – $17,500
5. Hope Gramley [a] (Aubrey, TX) – $12,500
[a] denotes amateur.

List of champions
2022: Birgit Noreiks
2021: Julia Bond
2020: Not held due to COVID-19 pandemic
2019: Dasha Kovalova
2018: Shannon O'Keefe
2017: Diana Zavjalova
2016: Bernice Lim
2015: Liz Johnson
2014: Maria Jose Rodriguez
2013: Diana Zavjalova
2012: Diandra Asbaty
2011: Missy Parkin 
2010: Kelly Kulick 
2009: Liz Johnson
2008: Lynda Barnes
2007: Kelly Kulick
2006: Shannon Pluhowsky
2005: Tennelle Milligan
2004: Marianne DiRupo
2003: Wendy Macpherson
2002: Kim Terrell
2001: Carolyn Dorin-Ballard
2000: Wendy Macpherson
1999: Leanne Barrette
1998: Lynda Norry
1997: Sandra Jo Shiery-Odom
1996: Lisa Wagner
1995: Sandy Postma
1994: Anne Marie Duggan
1993: Jan Schmidt
1992: Cindy Coburn-Carroll
1991: Dede Davidson
1990: Patty Ann
1989: Carol Gianotti
1988: Wendy Macpherson (largest-ever women's-only sporting event in history, some 88,000 participants)
1987: Cathy Almeida
1986: Cora Fiebig
1985: Aleta Sill
1984: Kazue Inahashi
1983: Aleta Rzepecki
1982: Katsuko Sugimoto
1981: Katsuko Sugimoto
1980: Donna Adamek
1979: Donna Adamek
1978: Loa Boxberger
1977: Dana Stewart
1976: Pamela Buckner
1975: Cindy Powell
1974: Judy Soutar
1973: Dorothy Fothergill
1972: Dorothy Fothergill
1971: Mildred Martorella
1970: Mildred Martorella
1969: Ann Feigel
1968: Phyllis Massey
1967: Mildred Martorella
1966: Judy Lee
1965: Betty Kuczynski
1964: D.D. Jacobson
1963: Irene Monterosso
1962: Dorothy Wilkinson
1961: Janet Harman

References

Ten-pin bowling competitions in the United States